W23BC was a low-power television station in Jackson, Mississippi. The station was owned and operated by Jackson State University. The station carried some programming from America One.

Until April 30, 2007, W23BC carried programming from the Black Family Channel, which folded on that date.  The station also carried some programming from Colours TV, a minority television channel that folded in July 2011. It is unknown when the station picked up Colours TV or America One.

The station's license was cancelled on September 24, 2013, due to its failure to file a renewal application.  However, it continues to broadcast as JSU TV, and is available only to Xfinity cable subscribers in Hinds, Madison, and Rankin counties.

External links 
 
 TV 23 on Twitter

Jackson State University
23BC
Defunct television stations in the United States
Television channels and stations disestablished in 2013
2013 disestablishments in Mississippi
23BC